Under the Moonspell is an EP by Portuguese gothic metal band Moonspell, released in 1994 on CD and vinyl.

Track listing 
 "Allah Akbar! La Allah Ella Allah! (Praeludium/Incantatum Solstitium)" – 1:51
 "Tenebrarum Oratorium (Andamento I/Erudit Compendyum) (Interludium/Incantatum Oequinoctium)" – 7:25
 "Tenebrarum Oratorium (Andamento II/Erotic Compendyum)" – 6:02
 "Opus Diabolicum (Andamento III/Instrumental Compendyum)" – 4:22
 "Chorai Lusitânia! (Epilogus/Incantatam Maresia)" – 1:46

Rerelease 
Under the Moonspell was rerecorded in 2007 along with other early Moonspell songs on the Under Satanæ release. The cover of Under Satanæ is an alternate version of the Under the Moonspell cover.

Personnel

Band 
 Fernando Ribeiro (Langsuyar) (vocals)
 Duarte Picoto (Mantus) (guitar)
 João Pereira (Tanngrisnir) (guitar)
 João Pedro Escoval (Ares/Tetragrammaton) (bass)
 Pedro Paixão (Passionis) (synthesizer)
 Miguel Gaspar (Mike/Nisroth) (drums)

Additional performers 
Flute – Sara Carreiras
Violin – Nuno Flores
Lyric Feminin Voice – Antonieta Lopes
Moans on "Opus Diabolicum" – Sara Arega
Arabic vocals on intro – Abdul Sewtea

Additional personnel 
 Christophe Szpajdel — logo

Moonspell albums
1994 debut EPs